Pat Williams (sometimes credited as Patrick Williams) is a Canadian television director and producer.

Working since the 1980s as a camera operator on such films as Police Academy (1984) and Cool Runnings (1993). Making his directorial debut in 1997, he has directed  episodes of The Secret World of Alex Mack. Some of his other television credits include Romeo!, So Weird, Strange Days at Blake Holsey High, Kyle XY, Smallville, Instant Star, Degrassi: The Next Generation, Kevin Hill, Aaron Stone, The Troop and Shattered.

References

External links

Canadian television directors
Canadian television producers
Living people
Place of birth missing (living people)
Year of birth missing (living people)
Canadian Screen Award winners